Conan III, also known as Conan of Cornouaille and  Conan the Fat (and ; c. 1093–1096 – September 17, 1148) was duke of Brittany, from 1112 to his death. He was the son of Alan IV, Duke of Brittany and Ermengarde of Anjou.

Conan III allied himself with Stephen of England in the Anarchy, Stephen's war against the dispossessed Empress Matilda.

Family
He married Maud, an illegitimate daughter of King Henry I of England before 1113. Conan and Maud had three children that are known:
Hoel (1116 - 1156) – disinherited from the Ducal crown; Count of Nantes; 
Bertha (1114 - after 1155) – married Alan of Penthièvre; upon Alan's death in 1146, she returned to Brittany;
Constance (1120 - 1148) – married  Sir Geoffroy II, Sire de Mayenne, son of Juhel II, Seigneur de Mayenne.

Succession
On his death-bed in 1148, Conan III disinherited Hoel from succession to the Duchy, stating that he was illegitimate and no son of his. By this surprise move Bertha became his heiress and successor. However, Hoel was to retain the County of Nantes.

Footnotes

Notes

Bibliography

See also
Dukes of Brittany family tree

1090s births
1148 deaths
12th-century dukes of Brittany
Dukes of Brittany
People of The Anarchy